Gudbrand Ensrud (born 21 June 1977) is a retired Norwegian football defender. Besides Norway, he has played in Austria and Germany.

He started his youth career in Fjellhamar FK and eventually continued to Lillestrøm. He made his Eliteserien debut in July 1996 against Vålerenga. After one more game for Lillestrøm he went on to Skjetten SK. In 2000 he joined Lyn and won promotion to 2001 Eliteserien, after which season he played three years for Hønefoss. Tenures in Austrian SW Bregenz and German Regionalliga club Chemnitzer FC followed.

After playing the 2007 1. divisjon for Moss he missed two years to knee injury.Already in the summer of 2008 he was advised to retire. In 2010 he instead became assistant manager of Drøbak-Frogn IL under Frode Birkeland, and in 2012 assistant manager of Fjellhamar FK under Jan Aksel Opsahl Odden.

References

1977 births
Living people
People from Lørenskog
Norwegian footballers
Lillestrøm SK players
Skjetten SK players
Lyn Fotball players
Hønefoss BK players
SW Bregenz players
Chemnitzer FC players
Moss FK players
Eliteserien players
Norwegian First Division players
Regionalliga players
Association football defenders
Norwegian expatriate footballers
Expatriate footballers in Austria
Norwegian expatriate sportspeople in Austria
Expatriate footballers in Germany
Norwegian expatriate sportspeople in Germany
Sportspeople from Viken (county)